Mirjana Beronja (Serbian Cyrillic: Мирјана Бероња; born 12 July 1986) is a Serbian women's basketball player. She currently plays for Swedish Udominate Basket.

With Partizan she won 3 national championships (2009/10, 2010/11, 2011/12), 1 national cups (2010/11) and 1 Adriatic Women's League (2011/12).

External links
Eurobasket profile

1986 births
Living people
Sportspeople from Sremska Mitrovica
Serbian women's basketball players
Serbian women's 3x3 basketball players
Point guards
ŽKK Partizan players
ŽKK Crvena zvezda players
ŽKK Radivoj Korać players
Serbian expatriate basketball people in Sweden
Serbian expatriate basketball people in the Czech Republic
Serbian expatriate basketball people in Slovakia
European Games competitors for Serbia
Basketball players at the 2019 European Games